Computer-aided (or computer-assisted) assessment (CAA) includes all forms of assessments students' progress, whether summative (i.e. tests that will contribute to formal qualifications) or formative (i.e. tests that promote learning but are not part of a course's marking), delivered with the help of computers. This covers both assessments delivered on computer, either online or on a local network, and those that are marked with the aid of computers, such as those using Optical Mark Reading (OMR). There are number of open source online tools to handle exams conducted on OMR sheets.

Computer-aided assessment can be viewed in a few different ways. Technically, assignments that are written on a computer and researched online are computer-aided assessments.  One of the most common forms of computer-aided assessment (in terms of e-learning) is online quizzes or exams. These can be implemented online, and also marked by the computer by putting the answers in. Many content management systems will have easy to set up and use systems for online exams. Such type of assessment supports various objective or multiple choice questions with images, fill in the blank, true false type questions. There are new technologies and tools coming up which can support subjective assessment of evaluation of the user. System can analyze theory answer written by the user.

It is also envisaged that computer-based formative assessment, in particular, will play an increasingly important role in learning, with the increased use of banks of question items for the construction and delivery of dynamic, on-demand assessments. This can be witnessed by current projects such as the SQA's SOLAR Project.

The effectiveness of these assessments has been frequently demonstrated in studies, both in the form of positive student feedback and improvement in student performance (see, for example, Einig (2013)).

See also
 Automated essay scoring
 E-assessment
 E-learning
 eExam

References

External links
 SQA SOLAR Project
 The STACK computer aided assessment system for mathematics

Software for teachers